Howe Township may refer to:

Howe Township, Forest County, Pennsylvania
Howe Township, Perry County, Pennsylvania
Howe Township, Grant County, North Dakota, in Grant County, North Dakota

Township name disambiguation pages